Liga 4, organized by Georgian Football Federation, is the fourth tier of Georgian football league.
It was founded in 2019 as a part of comprehensive reorganization of the league system.

Structure and format

In 2018, GFF decided to form an additional division between Liga 3 and Regionuli Liga by introducing Liga 4 for the 2019 season. After the first year the top two clubs were promoted to Liga 3 and the bottom two were supposed to be relegated to Regional league.

However, in February 2020 the league regulation sustained new changes, which saved the doomed teams from relegation and enlarged the tournament with four more Regionuli Liga clubs.

In January 2021, GFF announced that the number of clubs participating in the upcoming season would be increased to twenty, although for the next year they were reduced back to sixteen.

After the 2022 season the top three teams earned automatic promotion to Liga 3 and the bottom four clubs were relegated to Regionuli Liga.  

Seasons run based on Spring-Autumn system.

The number of teams in each season:

• 2019 = 10 

• 2020 = 16

• 2021 = 20

• 2022 = 16

Current members

Sixteen teams will take part in the league competition in 2023. Three of them, namely Dinamo Zugdidi, Shevardeni 1906 and Sulori Vani have taken part in the top division. There are also five junior teams of higher league members represented in Liga 4 this season. 
  

Expelled from Liga 2 on match-fixing allegations in May 2022, denied membership of Liga 3 in early 2023.

Failed to obtain a Liga 3 license.

Seasons

Previous years
In the first season ten teams played 27 games each. Eventually, two clubs from Tbilisi finished in top places awarding them promotion to the upper league.

The 2020 season was scheduled to start in April, but Covid-2019 postponed it for four months. In July GFF decided to form White and Red Groups with winners getting automatic promotion and bottom two clubs going down. 16 teams were split into two groups. The football season started in August and lasted five months with each team playing 14 games only. Two winners and two runners-up were promoted to Liga 3. 

The next year after the first phase Promotion and Relegation Groups were created. In the end the first four teams of the former advanced to Liga 3, while the bottom four of the latter dropped down a further level to Regionuli Liga.

In contrast, the 2022 season was held as a single two-round tournament.

Promoted teams

Note: Teams indicated in bold are champions.

Relegated teams

Participation per club
Taking into account the 2023 season, thirty-five teams have been members of this league for at least one year.  

Their current status as of 2023:

References

External links 
 

 
4
Geo